Cameron Reservoir is an artificial loch in the parish of Cameron in east Fife, Scotland. Covering an area of 69 hectares, it serves as a domestic water supply and contains beds of aquatic and marginal vegetation.

Cameron Reservoir is an important over-wintering location for pink-footed geese. It has been recognised as a wetland of international importance under the Ramsar Convention, and has been designated a Site of Special Scientific Interest and Special Protection Area.

References

Ramsar sites in Scotland
Sites of Special Scientific Interest in Scotland
Wetlands of Scotland